Scatman may refer to:

Scatman John (1942–1999), American vocalist and musician
"Scatman (Ski-Ba-Bop-Ba-Dop-Bop)", Scatman John's most famous song
Scatman Crothers (1910–1986), U.S. musician and actor